is a railway station in Tagawa, Fukuoka, Japan, operated by Kyushu Railway Company (JR Kyushu) and Heisei Chikuhō Railway.

On 1 April 2009, discount shop chain MrMax acquired naming rights to the Heisei Chikuhō part of the station.

Lines
Tagawa-Ita Station is served by the Hitahikosan Line. It is also served by the Heisei Chikuhō Railway Ita Line and Tagawa Line.

Adjacent stations

See also
 List of railway stations in Japan

References

External links

  
  

Railway stations in Japan opened in 1895
Railway stations in Fukuoka Prefecture
Tagawa, Fukuoka